HMTV is an Indian 24-hour Telugu news channel launched on 12 February 2009. The channel is operated by Hyderabad Media Pvt. Ltd, which also runs the English newspaper The Hans India. HMTV is a part of Kapil Group, promoted by K. Vaman Rao. Kapil Group is a business conglomerate of over 30 companies whose first company, Kapil Chit Funds was started in 1981. The current CEO of the channel is Mrs. Lakshmi Rao.

History 
HMTV launched on 12 February 2009 as a 24-hour Telugu news channel. It is operated by Hyderabad Media House Ltd. K. Ramachandra Murthy, a veteran journalist was the first CEO and chief editor of the channel. The slogan of the channel is "Vaartha Aagadu, Nijam Daagadu".

HMTV is also the first Telugu news channel to have an ombudsman to carry out a critical review of its content and provide a conduit for viewers.

In July 2014, Rajasekhar became the MD and chief editor of the channel replacing K. Ramachandra Murthy who previously served in those roles. As of 2017, the channel was not profitable.

Ownership 
The channel is owned by Kapil Group, promoted by K. Vaman Rao. Kapil Group is a conglomerate of over 30 companies having presence in over 16 business activities.

Kapil Chit Funds, the first company of the group started in 1981 at Karimnagar by K. Vaman Rao, a Chartered Accountant by profession. It later diversified into sectors like construction, property management, hospitality, manufacturing, media, energy, agriculture, healthcare, finance, IT.

Programming and reception 
The channel broadcasts shows such as "Jordar Varthalu", and "Nela Thalli". The public discussion program 'Dasa Disa' was widely acclaimed. K. Ramachandra Murthy, CEO of Hyderabad Media House at the time, mentioned that the acclaim for 'Dasa Disa' on the channel gave them the confidence to venture into print media with The Hans India in July 2011. The channel has also been lauded for taking up issues like the girl child, building toilets in government schools, drinking water etc. 

Padmaja Shaw of The Hoot, a media watchdog noted that HMTV maintained an apolitical stance unlike most other Telugu news channels. She also mentioned that the channel performed better in the Telangana region.

References

External links
 Official Site

Telugu-language television channels
24-hour television news channels in India
Television channels and stations established in 2009
Television stations in Hyderabad